Rajapakar is a community development block located in Vaishali district, Bihar.

Villages
Number of Panchayat : 13
Number of Villages : 67

Population and communities
Male Population : 162365 (2009 ist.)
Female Population : 157856
Total Population : 320221
SC Total Population : 210
ST Total Population : 15
Minority Total Population : 6559
Population Density : 1590
Sex Ratio : 991

Education
Literacy rate : 82.8% (2001 ist.)
Male literacy rate : 87%
Female literacy rate : 67.4%

School
KCI Rajapakar 
Primary School : 85 (2009 ist.)
Upper Primary School : 64

See also
 List of villages in Rajapakar block

References 

Community development blocks in Vaishali district